Zarechny is a rural locality (a village) in Yazykovsky Selsoviet, Blagovarsky District, Bashkortostan, Russia. The population was 106 as of 2010. There is 1 street.

Geography 
Zarechny is located 4 km southwest of Yazykovo (the district's administrative centre) by road. Yazykovo is the nearest rural locality.

References 

Rural localities in Blagovarsky District